Faramans is the name of two communes in France:

 Faramans, Ain
 Faramans, Isère